Ohio Valley Wrestling has held a variety of professional wrestling tournaments competed for by wrestlers that are a part of their roster.

Queen of OVW / Miss OVW Contest
The Queen of OVW / Miss OVW contest is a contest where a couple of female wrestlers in OVW (Ohio Valley Wrestling) are chosen and compete in several competitions. In the finals of the contest, the fans vote for the winner. The inaugural winner was ODB who is also the first ever OVW Women's Champion. The latest winner is Lovely Lylah who defeated Jessie Belle, Ray Lynn and Taeler Hendrix in the finals of the 2013 contest.

Nightmare Rumble

Men's

Women's

Nightmare Cup Tag Team Tournament

Nightmare Cup Tag Team Tournament (2012)
OVW announced a tournament to determine the number one contenders to the OVW Southern Tag Team Championship.

Teams:
James "Moose" Thomas and Michael Hayes
The Best Team Ever (Jessie Godderz and Rudy Switchblade)
Bolin Services 2.0 (Jayson Wayne and Rocco Bellagio)
Bolin Services 2.0.0 (Jack Black and Joe Coleman)
The Mobile Homers (Adam Revolver and Ted McNaler)
Los Ben Dejos (Ben Dejos and Marty Con Dejos)
The Mascara Mafia (Espy and Paredyse)
Raul LaMotta and Shiloh Jonze

(*) The Mascara Mafia had to withdraw from the tournament due to injury
(**) Replaced The Mascara Mafia

Nightmare Cup Tag Team Tournament (2013)
OVW announced a tournament to determine the number one contenders to the OVW Southern Tag Team Championship.

Teams:
Rob Terry and Marcus Anthony
The Best Team Ever (Jessie Godderz and Rudy Switchblade)
The Marauders (Joe Coleman and Shiloh Jonze)
The Mobile Homers (Adam Revolver and Ted McNaler)
The Rockstars (Rockstar Spud and Ryan Howe)
Michael Hayes and Mohammed Ali Vaez
The VIP Club (Joe Rosa and Robert De Luna)
Eddie Diamond and Timmy Danger

Nightmare Cup Tag Team Tournament (2015) 
Danny Davis announced the tournament at an OVW TV taping.

Teams:
Danny Davis and Trailer Park Trash
The No Class Connection (Deonta Davis and Leon Shelly)
Walk on the Wylde Side (Adam Wylde and Robbie Walker)
TerreMex (Randy Terrez and The Mexicutioner)
War Machine (Shiloh Jonze and Eric Locker)
The Fabulous Free Bodies (The Bodybuy and Big Jon)
The Congregation (Jade Dawson and Jake Glasure)

Nightmare Cup Tag Team Tournament (2019)

Teams:

Corey Storm and Dimes
Chace Destiny and Nigel
Dustin Jackson and Randall Floyd
Big D and Shiloh Jonze
The Legacy of Brutality (Ca$h Flo and Hy-Zaya)
The Mobile Homers (Adam Revolver and Ted McNaler)
King's Ransom (Leonis Khan and Maximus Khan)

Nightmare Cup Tag Team Tournament (2020) 

Teams:
The Tate Twins (Brandon and Brent Tate)
Atiba and Kal Herro
Dimes and Jay Bradley
Brother Austin and D'Mone Solavino
Amon and Sinn Bodhi
KTD and Omar Amir
Dustin Jackson and Ryan Howe
Manny Lemons and Tom Coffey

Nightmare Cup Tag Team Tournament (2021) 

Teams:
 The Recusants/Dysfunction (Brandon Espinosa and Tom Coffey)
 Level X (Axton Ray and Blanco Loco)
 Southern Discomfort (Jebediah Blackhawk and Snake Williams Jr.)
 Gustavo and Star Rider
 Cash Flo and Dimes
 The Box Office Blonds (Adam Swayze and Rex)
 The Fanny Pack Party (Dustin Jackson and Kal Herro)
 The Outrunners (Truth Magnum and Turbo Floyd)

OVW Kentucky Heavyweight Championship Tournament (2021)

See also
Professional wrestling tournament

References

External links
Ohio Valley Wrestling (OVW) Tournaments

Tournaments
Professional wrestling tournaments
Professional wrestling-related lists